Benjamin Lewis Vulliamy (25 January 1780 – 8 January 1854) was a clockmaker, active in 18th and 19th century Britain. He succeeded his father Benjamin Vulliamy as head of the firm and Clockmaker to the Crown.

Biography
The family was of Swiss origin. Justin Vulliamy, an ancestor, coming to England in 1704 to study the construction of English clocks and watches, under one Benjamin Gray, finally succeeded to his master's business at 68 Pall Mall, after having married his daughter. The old shop was situated at 52 Pall Mall, (where the Marlborough Club stood from 1868 until 1953) The firm obtained the appointment of Clockmakers to the Crown in 1742, which it held for 112 years.

Benjamin Lewis commenced early to make a special study of horology. Succeeding to the business, he erected clocks for several important buildings, including the victualling yard, Plymouth, Windsor Castle, churches at Norwood, Leytonstone, and Stratford, St Mary's Church, and the University Press at Oxford, and the cathedral at Calcutta. The clock at the post office, St. Martin's-le-Grand, was one made by Vulliamy for the Earl of Lonsdale. Vulliamy was a man of considerable ingenuity, and introduced several peculiarities and improvements into his clocks.

Vulliamy was elected associate of the Institution of Civil Engineers on 13 March 1838, was auditor for the year 1842, and obtained in 1846 a premium of books for a paper on railway clocks. He was made free of the Clockmakers' Company on 4 December 1809, admitted to the livery in January 1810, and five times filled the office of master. He was elected a fellow of the Royal Astronomical Society on 14 January 1831, and retained his connection with the society till his death.

Vulliamy was a man who some considered to have a refined taste in art, and possessed  knowledge of architecture, paintings, and engravings. His library was extensive, especially in that portion which related to his profession of clockmaking. He also possessed a valuable collection of ancient watches. He added to the libraries of the Clockmakers' Company and of the Institution of Civil Engineers. To the company he also gave numerous models and specimens of clocks and watches, and to the institution he presented in 1847 the works of a clock made by Thomas Tompion about 1670 for Charles II, by whom it was given to Barbara Palmer, 1st Duchess of Cleveland. On 1 March 1850 he exhibited to the Royal Archæological Institute six carvings in ivory by Fiamminge. He died on 8 January 1854, leaving two sons, Benjamin Lewis (1817–1886) and George John. Neither of his sons followed him in business and his stock of 170 gold watches and 100 clocks and cases was sold by Christine and Manson, King Street, St James’s on 8 June 1854.

He was a great-uncle of the art potter Blanche Georgiana Vulliamy.

Published works
Vulliamy published:
 Some Considerations on the Subject of Public Clocks, London, 1828, 1831 (a supplement was issued in 1830, and again in 1831).
 Summary of the Advantages attendant upon the new Mode of Construction of a Turret Clock, London, 1831.
 On the Construction and Regulation of Clocks for Railway Stations, London, 1845 (reprinted from the Minutes of Proceedings of the Institution of Civil Engineers).
 On the Construction and Theory of the Dead-beat Escapement for Clocks, London, 1846.
 A Portion of the Papers relating to the Great Clock for the New Palace at Westminster, London, 1848.
Vulliamy wrote an account of the Stockton motion in English repeaters for the article Watch in Rees's Cyclopædia.

Turret Clocks

His study of turret clocks lead him to introduce the 2 second pendulum to improve accuracy.

Royal Pavilion, Brighton ca. 1814 (moved to Buckingham Palace in 1848)
Horse Guards, London. 1816 (pendulum of 2 seconds)
St Luke's Church, West Norwood 1827
Quadrangle clock, Windsor Castle 1829
General Post Office, St Martin’s le Grand 1830
The Old Clock House, Maze Hill, St Leonards 1830
St Margaret’s Church, Mapledurham, Oxfordshire 1832 (pendulum of 2 seconds)
St Bartholomew’s Church, Sydenham 1833
St John's Church, Stratford 1834
Holy Trinity Church, Adelaide, Australia 1838
Tom Tower, Christ Church, Oxford 1838 (pendulum of 2 seconds)
Church of St Philip and St James, Norton St Philip, Somerset 1841
Gopsall hall, Leicestershire 1842 (repairs to clock by Thomas Mudge of London, 1753)
St Catherine's Church, Westonbirt, Gloucestershire 1843
St Michael's Church, Basingstoke, 1843 (pendulum of 2 seconds)
St James' Church, Louth 1847 (replaced in 1901)
Somerleyton Hall, Suffolk 1847 (pendulum of 2 seconds) 
Royal William Victualling Yard Plymouth 1847 (pendulum of 2 seconds)
St John’s Church, Leytonstone
University Press, Oxford
St. Paul’s Cathedral, Kolkata

See also
Vulliamy family

Notes

References
.

External links
 UK Parliamentary Archives, Vulliamy Clock Designs

Attribution

1780 births
1854 deaths
English clockmakers
British people of Swiss descent
Turret clock makers of the United Kingdom
Benjamin Lewis